The 1968 Grand National was the 122nd renewal of the Grand National horse race that took place at Aintree Racecourse near Liverpool, England, on 30 March 1968.

The winner was the nine-year-old Red Alligator, by 20 lengths. He was ridden by jockey Brian Fletcher, who later rode Red Rum to victory in 1973 and 1974.

Tim Durant on Highlandie became the oldest jockey ever to complete the course at the age of 68.

Finishing order

Non-finishers

Media coverage

The race was shown in a special edition of Grandstand on the BBC which was presented by David Coleman. The commentary team remained the same as the previous year, Peter O'Sullevan, Bob Haynes, Michael O'Hehir and Michael Seth-Smith. This was to be the final Grand National commentary for Bob Haynes.

References

 1968
Grand National
Grand National
20th century in Lancashire
Grand National